The Auster J/1 Autocrat was a 1940s British single-engined three-seat high-wing touring monoplane built by Auster Aircraft Limited at Rearsby, Leicestershire.

History
As the end of the Second World War approached, the designers at Taylorcraft decided to develop a tourer version of the robust and reliable Taylorcraft Auster Model J AOP.V observation aircraft series. An Auster 5, registered G-AGOH, was modified to take a 100 hp (75 kW) Blackburn Cirrus II engine for trials. At the same time a prototype aircraft was built designated the Taylorcraft Auster V Series J/1 Autocrat. The long name was not used as the company changed name to Auster Aircraft Limited and the aircraft became known as the Auster J/1 Autocrat.

The designation J/1 derived from the progenitor Model J, which was the Auster AOP.V.

Production and operation

The first production aircraft, registered G-AGTO, was delivered in December 1945. One of the more spectacular feats of the type was the first visit of a civilian aircraft to an aircraft carrier,  in the English Channel in October 1946. The last Rearsby built J/1s were delivered in 1952.

The Autocrat became one of the most successful post-war British light aircraft with more than 400 built. A small number of variants were built and the aircraft became the basis for a family of light aircraft. The Autocrat was used by individual pilots, aero clubs and by small charter firms for passenger flights, banner towing and photography.

Many J/1s were converted to J/1N Alpha standard with a higher fin and fitted with a 130 h.p. Gipsy Major engine, as used in the J/1B Aiglet.  45 new build J/1N Alphas were completed in 1956–57, mainly for export to Australia.

A single Autocrat G-AGVI was converted by V.H. Bellamy in 1965 to be powered by a Rover TP gas turbine engine. It reverted to normal power in 1968.

Starting in 1946, newly built examples of the Autocrat and Alpha were exported direct from the production line at Rearsby to many countries worldwide including Argentina, Australia, Belgium, Brazil, Ceylon, Denmark, Egypt, France, Iraq, Jordan, Netherlands, New Zealand, Norway, Pakistan, South Africa, Southern Rhodesia, Sweden, Switzerland, Trinidad and Tobago, Uganda and Uruguay. Other UK-registered aircraft were later sold overseas on the secondhand market.

Numbers of Autocrats and Alphas continue to fly into the 2010s with private owners in the United Kingdom, Australia, New Zealand and elsewhere.

Variants
Auster J/1 Autocratproduction version with Blackburn Cirrus Major engine. Several later fitted with engines up to the 150 h.p. Lycoming O-320-A1A. 
Auster J/1A Autocratadditional (fourth-seat) for joyriding.
Auster J/1N Alphapowered by a de Havilland Gipsy Major I engine and with enlarged tail surfaces. Four seater.
Auster J/1S Autocratpowered by a 145 h.p. de Havilland Gipsy Major 10 Mk 2-2 engine.

Kingsford Smith Kingsmith
An Auster J/1 conversion in Australia by Kingsford Smith Aviation Services, fitted with a 150hp (112kW) Avco Lycoming O-320 engine and other improvement (including better seating and sound-proofing).

Operators

Civil operators

Imperial Iranian Aero Club

Sherut Avir
Israeli Air Force

Kuwait Air Force

Royal Jordanian Air Force

Rhodesian Air Force – one aircraft only

Southern Rhodesian Air Force – one aircraft only
Royal Pakistan Airforce

Specifications (Auster J/1 Autocrat)

See also

In popular culture
An Auster Autocrat (registration G-AIGD) was featured in Episode 42 of the BBC series Father Brown which first aired in January 2016.

An Auster J/1N featured in Foyle's War Series 8 Episode 3, Elise, airdate January 2015.

References

Further reading

External links

High-wing aircraft
Single-engined tractor aircraft
1940s British civil utility aircraft
Auster aircraft
Aircraft first flown in 1945